Kleo is a German action-thriller television series co-created by Hanno Hackfort, Richard Kropf and Bob Konrad for Netflix. It follows the revenge journey of a former East German Stasi assassin, Kleo Straub (Jella Haase), after her arrest and subsequent imprisonment until the fall of the Berlin Wall.

It premiered on Netflix on 19 August 2022, and was renewed for a second season on 29 September 2022.

Synopsis 
In 1987, after successfully assassinating a double agent in a West Berlin club, East German Stasi assassin Kleo Straub, a blond pretty young girl is falsely imprisoned by her agency. When she is released after the Berlin Wall is taken down in 1990, she plans her revenge on the conspirators who framed her. Meanwhile, Sven Petzold, an underappreciated fraud policeman who witnessed the 1987 murder, finds connections between it and Straub, leading him to impede her vengeance quest.

Cast

 Jella Haase as Kleo Straub, an unofficial East German Stasi assassin who was imprisoned for an alleged act of treason
 Rosa Wirtz plays a younger version of her.
 Dimitrij Schaad as Sven Petzold, an underachieving West Berlin police officer who initially worked in the fraud section
 Julius Feldmeier as Thilo, current occupant of Kleo's old apartment who came from West Germany
 Vincent Redetzki as Uwe Mittig, an unofficial East German Stasi agent who was an accomplice of Kleo's during her 1987 mission
 Vladimir Burlakov as Andi Wolf, a former East German Stasi supervisor who was romantically involved with Kleo
 Marta Sroka as Anja, Wolf's spouse who is pregnant with his child
 Jürgen Heinrich as Otto Straub, an East German Stasi general commander who is Kleo's grandfather
 Alessija Lause as Anne Geike, a West German BND officer who previously met Otto Straub

Recurring 

 Steffi Kühnert as Margot Honecker, the wife of East German leader Erich Honecker and a high-ranking communist party official in her own right, who is Kleo's aunt
 Thandi Sebe as Jenny Schneider, Sven's wife who becomes emotionally distant from him
 Taner Sahintürk as Frederick "Freddy" Lembech, Sven's friend and colleague in the police
 Yun Huang as Min Sun, a BND officer of Chinese origin who works under Anne Geike
 Zethphan Smith-Gneist as Mark Petzold, Sven and Jenny's teenage son
 Alexander Hörbe as Ludger Wieczorek, a former East German colonel who was in charge of Kleo's 1987 mission
 Rodrigo Rojo as Jorge Gonzalez, a Stasi agent who immigrated from Chile  
 Gunnar Helm as Erich Mielke, the head of the Stasi who is involved in Kleo's imprisonment (in real-life, Mielke died of natural causes in 2000)
 Anna Stieblich as Brigitte Straub, Kleo's mother who abandoned her for West Germany
 Garry Fischmann as Matthias Frey, a man Kleo assassinated in West Berlin on 1987, setting the stage for her predicament
 Jonas Stenzel as Dopi, Thilo's friend who is a techno music DJ

Guest starring 
 Harry Schäfer as Alexander Belov, a Soviet KGB agent who has made a deal with Wieczorek
 Kathrin Angerer as Gabriela Wieczorek, Ludger's wife, who resides in Mallorca after faking their deaths
 Bruno F. Apitz as Walter Blum, East German Party secretary and a close friend of Wieczorek's who knows his whereabouts
 Lina Wendel as Ms. Lobrecht, Mielke's secretary, who has been assigned with the protection of a red briefcase
 Anselm Bresgott as Holger, Kleo's childhood friend and former love interest
 Jakob Albert plays a younger version of him.
 Thiago Braga de Oliveira as a concierge in Hotel Carrera

Show creators Richard Kropf and Hanno Hackfort also have cameo roles.

Episodes

Production

Development 

On 8 February 2022, Netflix ordered Kleo as a part of 19 German-language productions worth US$571 million. Hanno Hackfort, Richard Kropf and Bob Konrad, co-creators of 4 Blocks, were revealed as series creators, writers and executive producers, with Elena Senft set to co-write. Michael Souvigner and Till Derenbach of Zeitsprung Pictures were also announced as co-producers, while Viviane Andereggen and Jano Ben Chaabane were signed as directors. The series was renewed on 29 September 2022.

Casting 

Upon the series announcement on 8 February 2022, Jella Hasse was announced as the titular lead of the series.

Filming 

Principal photography for the series reportedly began in June 2021, with Berlin, Eisenhüttenstadt, and Mallorca revealed as filming locations.

Release 
Kleo premiered worldwide on 19 August 2022.

Marketing 
The series' first official trailer was launched on YouTube on 14 July 2022.

Reception 
The first season of Kleo received positive reviews from critics.  Rebecca Nicholson of The Guardian rated the series 3/5 stars, criticizing its similarity with Killing Eve, but praised its casting, characterization, screenplay and pacing, calling it "nevertheless an entertaining, highly stylized and cinematic adventure". Maria Hunstig of Vogue Germany praised the casting, screenplay and pacing, calling it "fast, hard, and incredibly entertaining". Joel Keller of Decider similarly praised its pacing and acting, particularly lauding Hasse's performance. Stephen King also praised the series, calling it "a breath of fresh air—suspenseful and also very funny".

References

External links 

 
 

2020s German comedy television series
2022 German television series debuts
Action television series
Berlin Wall in fiction
Cold War in popular culture
Communism in fiction
East Germany in fiction
Espionage television series
German-language Netflix original programming
German action television series
German comedy-drama television series
Spy thriller television series
Television series about conspiracy theories
Television series about intelligence agencies
Television series based on actual events
Television series set in the 1990s
Television shows set in Berlin
Television shows set in Chile